is a Japanese manga series written and illustrated by Ryo Nakama. It was serialized in Shueisha's Weekly Shōnen Jump from September 2020 to February 2023.

Publication
Shueisha has collected its chapters into individual tankōbon volumes. The first volume was released on February 4, 2021. As of January 4, 2023, eight volumes have been released.

The manga is being simultaneously published in English by Viz Media on its Shonen Jump service and by Shueisha's Manga Plus online platform. Viz Media will also publish its volumes in digital format.

Volume list

Reception
The series was nominated for the 2022 Next Manga Award in the print manga category and placed 9th out of 50 nominees.

See also
Isobe Isobē Monogatari, another manga series by the same author

References

Further reading

External links
 

Comedy anime and manga
School life in anime and manga
Shōnen manga
Shueisha manga
Viz Media manga